"Lively Arts" is a single released by English rock band The Damned.

Big Beat, budget imprint of Chiswick Records, followed up their belated release of "Wait for the Blackout" as a single with the release of another track from The Black Album, "Lively Arts". Like all of Big Beat's Damned reissues, the single failed to chart, not helped by the band not promoting it (they had recently released the new LP Strawberries on Bronze Records) and partly due to the track having been available on the album for two years.

Track listing
 "Lively Arts" (Scabies, Sensible, Vanian, Gray) - 3:57
 "Teenage Dream" (Scabies, Sensible, Vanian, Ward) - 2:36

Bonus Track on 10"/12" single: -

 "I'm So Bored" (Scabies, Sensible, Vanian, Ward) - 1:17

Production credits
 Producers:
 The Damned
 Musicians:
 Dave Vanian: Vocals
 Captain Sensible: Guitar
 Rat Scabies: Drums
 Paul Gray: Bass on "Lively Arts"
 Algy Ward: Bass on "Teenage Dream" and "I'm So Bored"
 Hanz Zimmer: synthesizer on "Lively Arts"

External links

1982 singles
The Damned (band) songs
Songs written by Rat Scabies
Songs written by Captain Sensible
Songs written by David Vanian
Songs written by Paul Gray (English musician)
1982 songs